Michael K. Randolph (born 1946) is the chief justice of the Supreme Court of Mississippi.  He represents District 2 Place 3.

Early years 
Randolph is the son of a construction worker who had a third-grade education.

He served as an air traffic controller in Vietnam with the U.S. Army 1st Infantry Division and was honorably discharged in 1967. After serving in the army, he joined the Navy reserves.

In 1972, he graduated from Rollins College, and two years later, he earned a Juris Doctor from the University of Mississippi School of Law. While in law school, he joined the U.S. Naval Reserve, attending the Naval Justice School, and serving as an attorney with the Judge Advocate General Corps. He received an honorable discharge in 1975.

Career 
From 1975 until 2004, Randolph practiced law in Biloxi, Mississippi and Hattiesburg, Mississippi. On April 23, 2004, Gov. Haley Barbour appointed Randolph to the Mississippi Supreme Court to serve the unexpired term of former Chief Justice Edwin L. Pittman. In November 2004, Randolph was elected to the Supreme Court for an eight-year term that began January 1, 2005. He became Chief Justice on January 31, 2019.

President Ronald Reagan appointed Randolph to serve on the National Coal Council.  Randolph has also served on the board of directors for William Carey College, and he was past president of the South Central Mississippi Bar Association.

Personal life 
Randolph is married to Kathy Webb Randolph. He has three children and five grandchildren. He is a member of Temple Baptist Church.

References 

|-

1946 births
Living people
20th-century American lawyers
21st-century American judges
21st-century American lawyers
Chief Justices of the Mississippi Supreme Court
Justices of the Mississippi Supreme Court
Rollins College alumni
University of Mississippi alumni
Air traffic controllers
United States Army personnel of the Vietnam War
United States Army soldiers
United States Navy sailors
United States Navy reservists